David Rogerson Wheatley (20 December 1949 – 5 April 2009) was a British film and television director.

His Royal College of Art graduation film was on the Belgian surrealist artist René Magritte, after his tutor Gavin Millar showed him a book on the artist. The film was screened as part of the BBC's arts' programmes Omnibus in 1979. From that year, he contributed films to the Omnibus and Arena series, before branching out into other areas in the mid 1980s.

He directed The Magic Toyshop (1987), a fantasy film based on the Angela Carter novel, which Carter adapted herself, and several social dramas set in the north of England. In the early 1990s he directed a series of Catherine Cookson adaptations for Tyne Tees which gained audiences of 14 million. He also directed episodes of Fat Friends and Dalziel and Pascoe.

He died after a long illness on 5 April 2009, aged 59. He was survived by his mother, Ellen, his father, Fred, a son Alexander from his marriage to Melanie Pringle, and a daughter Francesca from his relationship with Camilla Tress.

See also 
 The March (1990 film), a film directed by David Wheatley

References

External links
 

1949 births
2009 deaths
Alumni of the Royal College of Art
British film directors
English television directors
People from Sunderland